Green Lake — also known as Big Green Lake (to distinguish it from Little Green Lake, which is near Markesan)— is a lake in Green Lake County, Wisconsin, United States. Green Lake has  of diverse shoreline, ranging from sandstone bluffs to marshes.

History

First Settlers 
The Ho-Chunk Nation of Wisconsin, also referred to as the Winnebago, were some of the first residents in the Green Lake Area. Green Lake, also known as Daycholah, is a spiritual place for the Winnebago.  One legend describes how one must bring gifts for the Water Spirit that lives under the lake in order to enter. With the increase of European settlers, the Winnebago were subject to forced relocation by the United States government several times. Once they were removed from the Green Lake area, they were moved to Iowa until the establishment of a reservation in Blue Earth County, Minnesota.

Chief Highknocker 
Chief Highknocker was the last reigning chief of the Green Lake area. He was born in 1820 with the given name Henaga. He spent most of his life around the lake but was forced to move further north because of the ever-increasing number of settlers. He continued visiting Green Lake every summer with other members of the tribe. On August 12, 1911, at the age of 91, he drowned after getting a cramp while swimming in the lake. His grave at Dartford Cemetery is marked by a large boulder with an inscription from the community.

European Settlement 
French settlers initially called the lake Lac Verde. In 1836, Wisconsin land could be purchased through the Green Bay Land Office at $1.25 per acre. Anson Dart built a dam with Smith Fowler and his own son in an effort to raise the lake level, leading to the namesake of Dartford (now called Green Lake). The next year, Dart built a sawmill that used the mill race created by the dam. The dam's success in raising lake level allowed different types of mills to be constructed around Green Lake. Many large, wooden hotels and one short-lived casino populated the north shore during the late 19th century in the city of Green Lake, but most have burned down. One was the Pleasant Point, which opened in the early 1880s. The name "Green Lake" comes from the green color of its deep waters. The city of Green Lake is located on the northeast shore in Dartford Bay.

Lone Tree Farm 
Because of the proximity to the lake, the land was ideal for farming. In 1888, Victor and Jessie Lawson purchased a plot of land called Lone Tree Point that would later become Lone Tree Farm. Victor Lawson was a newspaper editor and philanthropist, and his wife Jessie was the primary planner for their estate. Together, the Lawson's developed approximately 1,100 acres of land that is still used today as a religious conference center. Some features of the estate include roads, a boathouse, and, at the time, the largest dairy barn in Wisconsin.

Geography 
The City of Green Lake, with a population of 828 as of 2018, is located on the northeast shore at the outflow of the Puchyan River. There are six public lands and parks on or near the lake: Sunset Park, Daycholah Lookout, Spring Lake County Park, Hattie Sherwood Park, Deacon Mills Park, and Playground Park. The lake has three beaches: Hattie Sherwood Beach, Dodge Country Park Beach, and Sunset County Park. There are eight public access boat landings on Green Lake.

Green Lake lies within the Big Green Lake drainage basin which covers three counties. The majority of the drainage basin is in Green Lake County, with small portions of the drainage basin within the western edges of both Winnebago and Fond Du Lac counties. It lies within the Upper Fox River drainage basin, which is part of the Great Lakes drainage basin.

Spring Lake and Twin Lakes are three small lakes south of the southern shore that flow into Green Lake.

Green Lake has several bays, coves, points and peninsulas. On the northern shore, from West to East, are: Beyers Cover at the western edge of the northern shore; Sugar Loaf, a peninsula with a tall bluff; Norwegian Bay, bounded on the West by Sugar Loaf; Pigeon Cove and Malcolm Bay on the central north shore; and Dartford Bay, surrounded by the City of Green Lake at the primary outflow of the Puchyan River . Along the southern shore, from West to East: Blackbird point, a small protrusion; Dickinson Bay, a small bay on the west-central southern shore; Sandstone Bay; and Sandstone Bluff, a point that bounds Sandstone Bay on the East.

Land Use in Green Lake Watershed

Geology 

The Green Lake basin exists within a river-carved valley that originated prior to the Wisconsin glaciation. It is likely that the movement of the glacier also deepened the valley, as well as smoothed its sides. The basin is composed mainly of Potsdam sandstone. Beginning just below the water surface is a layer of Madison Sandstone ( thick), followed by dolomite, St. Peter Sandstone ( thick), and Trenton limestone. The shoreline is diverse, ranging from sandy beaches to swamps to steep cliffs where the bedrock is exposed, such as in the image on the left.

The glacial activity that created the Green Lake moraine also sculpted the surrounding topography. These ridges are covered in a thin layer of glacial till that is composed mainly of sand eroded from the native sandstones in the area.

The water level increase caused by the dam at the head of the Puchyan has had profound impacts on the shoreline of the lake, mainly in the creation of many immature beaches. The maturity of these beaches is dictated by the composition of the shore, where looser till material erodes much more quickly than even the fragile sections of exposed bedrock. These looser areas mature more quickly. In more mature areas, boulders from the strata that are kept pushed against the shore by ice provide protection from erosion.

Hydrology

Drainage Basin 
Only Lake Wazee, a man-made lake, is deeper, and only Lake Winnebago has a larger volume. The deepest and steepest part of the basin is near the west end, while the eastern third is more shallow. The maximum gradient is 33% at Lucas Bluff, a large rock face on the southeast shore.

The drainage basin lies mostly in Green Lake County, but extends east into Fond du Lac and Winnebago County. In addition to Green Lake, the drainage basin includes Spring Lake and the East and West Twin Lakes.

Tributaries and Outlet 
The components of the Green Lake basin water budget are, in approximate percentages: direct precipitation, 51%; surface water, 41%; ground water, 8%. Eight creeks make up the surface water supply, the largest being Silver Creek, which flows into the east end of the lake. The remaining seven are Hill Creek, White Creek, Dakin Creek, Wurches Creek, Roy Creek, Spring Creek, Assembly Creek. The primary outflow is the Puchyan River, a tributary to the upper Fox River that lies in the Lake Michigan drainage basin. This makes Green Lake a drainage lake, a lake in which surface outflow dominates. A dam in the outlet keeps the water level in the lake around  higher than the natural level. Green Lake has a retention time of 21 years, relatively long for a temperate lake of its size. This has implications for lake health because with very low rates of flushing, there is a large lag for reversion of fertility changes.

Water Chemistry and Quality

Temperature 
The median ice cover duration of the last 67 seasons is 87 days. Green Lake has lost over 25 days of ice cover since 1940, and at the current rate, will continue to lose one day of ice cover every three years. At this rate, Green Lake is estimated to have zero ice cover by 2087.

Oxygen 
Dissolved oxygen (DO) is key to the health of aquatic ecosystems. It is essential for the metabolism of all aerobic organisms, therefore controlling their distribution, behavior, and growth within the ecosystem. If oxygen is depleted, these organisms will die or not do well. Oxygen also reacts with many other compounds, influencing their availability and chemical forms. Due to its thermal stratification, the concentration of DO in Green Lake decreases through the thermocline and into the hypolimnion. The dissolved oxygen drops from ~9 mg/L to ~4 mg/L before rebounding and slowly decreasing into the hypolimnion. Based on other chemical characteristics such as pH and chlorophyll fluorescence at this depth, it is likely that  the metalinetic oxygen minimum results from a concentration of respiring plankton. The quality of the environment can be judged by oxygen levels. Because the DO level is <5 mg/L, the lake was classified as "impaired" by the Wisconsin DNR in 2014. The low DO in this band poses a danger for aerobic organisms and has the potential to expand.

Another threat facing the lake is hypolimnetic oxygen depletion. A paleolimnological sediment analysis conducted in the deep basins of the lake showed trends of oxygen depletion since 1950. Though the deep waters are not yet devoid of oxygen, the oxygen is being depleted faster than it was in 1950. This is a result of increased nutrient (nitrogen and phosphorus) availability in the epilimnion, which increases biological productivity. As these organisms die, sink, and aerobically decompose, oxygen is depleted.

Nitrogen and Phosphorus 
Nitrogen is essential in many biomolecules, such as amino acids, and has roles in biosignalling. It is also a major excretory product of livestock and a key ingredient in fertilizers, both of which play a key role in the agriculturally-dense Big Green Lake drainage basin. Phosphorus is also a key element in living things, constituting molecules such nucleic acids and phospholipid membranes. Like nitrogen, it is a major excretory product of livestock and a key ingredient in fertilizers. Nitrogen and phosphorus are often identified as limiting nutrients in aquatic ecosystems, since they are limited in availability relative to their demand in the ecosystem. Should the availability of phosphorus increase, algal growth will increase, decreasing water quality. Increase in phosphorus concentration are the most pressing threat to the health of Green Lake Total phosphorus values in the epilimnion range from 10 μg/L to 50 μg/L. Due to variation and associated confidence limits in the average total phosphorus level of 17.2 μg/L, the lake does not meet the "impairment" designation of >15 μg/L of phosphorus. It is likely, however, that the lake is impaired. Increasing phosphorus is likely to blame for the hypolimnetic oxygen depletion and metalimnetic oxygen minimum mentioned in the previous section. Because most of the tributaries enter on the east end of the lake, phosphorus has generally been higher in the east end. Current lake management efforts focus heavily on monitoring and reducing phosphorus loading within the drainage basin by controlling erosion, runoff, and fertilizer use.

The specific conductance ranges from 502.80 - 532.88 microSiemens per centimeter.

Flora and Fauna

Flora 
Aquatic vegetation found in most recent survey

The most abundant native aquatic plant species found in Green Lake, based on littoral frequency of occurrence, are: Coontail, at 53%; Sago pondweed, at 15%; Wild celery, at 13%; and White water-crowfoot, at 12%.

Fishes 
Green Lake is a highly productive and highly utilized fishery. Because of its depth, it supports both a warm-water and cold-water fishery, though species of the warm-water fishery predominate. 40 species of fish have been documented in Green Lake.

Common Warm-water Fishery Species 

 Largemouth bass
 Smallmouth bass
 Walleye
 Northern pike
 White bass
 Channel catfish
 Bluegill
 Black crappie
 White crappie
 Yellow perch
 Rock bass
 Muskellunge (stocked)
 Common carp

Cold-water Fishery 

 Cisco
 Lake trout (stocked)
 Splake
 Brook trout
 Brown trout
 Rainbow trout

Ecology

Ecology of the Warm-water Fishery 
Both small and largemouth bass reproduce naturally and maintain stable populations in the lake. Largemouth are susceptible to habitat loss due to the low amount of vegetated littoral habitat. Smallmouth bass thrive in the lake due to the rocky and steep bottom, and walleye naturally maintain a low population in Green Lake. Targeted fishing, limited littoral habitat, late spring warming, and predation on eggs, fry, and fingerlings limit the size of the population. Similarly, northern pike are also limited by spawning habitat degradation by development, boating, and carp. Angling also puts heavy pressure on the population, so size and bag limits have been implemented to help reduce the strain. Panfish maintain healthy populations, but angling and shoreline development represent main threats. The loss of woody vegetation along the shoreline is especially damaging.

Studies have also focused on the health of non-game fish populations as they related to ecosystem health. In Green Lake, species such as the blackchin shiner, Iowa darter, and mottled sculpin are all intolerant to environmental disruption and therefore serve as indicator species of lake health. In addition to carp disturbance, shoreline development, and boating disturbance, cyanobacteria blooms, zebra mussels, and filamentous algae growth may also represent limiting factors to habitat health and fish growth.

Ecology of the Cold-water Fishery 
Cisco are native to Green Lake and are regularly fished. They are very sensitive to environmental change, and their populations are in flux. Recent surveys in Green Lake have shown that the cisco population has slightly declined, possibly due to the ecological effects of eutrophication. Climate change severely threatens cisco, and their populations could be reduced by 30-70%. Lake trout are the prized species of the cold-water fishery, and the WDNR stocks 25,000 yearlings annually. These fish are raised at the Green Lake Cooperative fish rearing facility, which is owned by the Green Lake Sanitary District and operated in conjunction with the WDNR. There have been reports of scarring on adult lake trout, suggesting possible conflict with muskellunge in the boundaries between the warm and cold-water fisheries. A main threat facing the fish of the cold-water fishery is oxygen depletion, especially in the deep west basin.

Aquatic Vegetation and Algae 
A majority of aquatic vegetation was found growing at a depth of 14 feet (4.27 m) and a maximum depth of 23 feet (7.01 m). Of all the observed species, coontail and hybrid water milfoil were the highest frequency of occurrence. Coontail is a common aquatic species in Wisconsin and able to survive and thrive in areas with light deficiency as it receives a majority of nutrients from the water. The ability to grow in deeper areas of the littoral zone allows coontail to provide habitat for invertebrates and fish. Species like common carp and zebra mussels have contributed to the degeneration of shallow aquatic plant species. The high nutrient concentrations attribute to algal growth that may have future negative effects.

Environmental Concerns

Pollution 
Prior to European settlement, the lake was considered to be oligotrophic, meaning that it had low biological productivity and good water quality based on a trophic state index. Green Lake is now considered to be mesotrophic lake because of increased nutrient loading from both natural and anthropogoenic causes. Water quality has since decreased and is considered “impaired” per standards laid out in the Clean Water Act by the Environmental Protection Agency.

Invasive Species

Invasive Flora 
Hybrid water milfoil and curly-leaf pondweed have been documented in Green Lake since 1971. A 2014 survey showed that hybrid water milfoil increased in dominance to make up 25% of the aquatic plant species. The most frequently found singular plant species in the lake in 2015 was Eurasian water milfoil at 20% of relative frequency. Another invasive plant species, the spiny naiad (Najas marina), was documented in a 2007 WDNR survey, but was not observed in the 2014 survey.
 Eurasian water milfoil 
Hybrid water milfoil 
 Curly-leaf pondweed 
 Purple loosestrife 
 Reed canary grass

Invasive Fauna 
Common carp have contributed to the degradation of plant species and fish spawning locations in the shallow areas of the lake in addition to the Silver Creek inflow and nearby County K Marsh. Placing carp barriers have contributed to a regeneration of the aquatic plant species in the Silver Creek inflow, but not for the County K Marsh. The unsuccessful control in County K Marsh is attributed to the high levels of phosphorus that enter from Silver Creek. Both zebra and quagga mussel species positively influence the growth of the green algae species Cladophora glomerata. The Cladophora population has been steadily increasing since 1921 to now nuisance levels. This particular green algae thrives in the high nutrient concentrations and its high density has ecological consequences. Some of these include encouraging the expansion of zebra and quagga mussel populations and inhibiting the spawning of native fish populations.

 (German) Common carp
Zebra mussels 
 Quagga mussels
 Freshwater Jellyfish

Development and Management 

There are three organizations associated with managing Green Lake: Green Lake Association, Green Lake Sanitary District, and the Green Lake Conservancy (also known as Green Lake Preservation Society).

Green Lake Conservancy 
The Green Lake Conservancy is an organization dedicated to preserving the lands surrounding Green Lake. The organization works by acquiring environmentally sensitive properties, such as woods or wetlands, and protecting them by placing them into conservancy. They are then cooperatively managed with the WDNR and Green Lake Sanitary District. To date, they have protected 15 properties around the lake.

Green Lake Association 
Founded in 1951, the Green Lake Association (GLA) is a 501 (c)(3) nonprofit, membership organization. Their membership includes nearly 800 households and businesses within the drainage basin. They focus on the water quality of the Big Green Lake drainage basin.

Recreation 

The lake and its surrounding topography have opportunities for a large range of recreational activities year-round.

During the summer, activities such as boating, water skiing, wakeboarding, tubing, swimming, sailing, jet skiing, kayaking, canoeing, paddleboarding, and fishing are common. The Green Lake Sailing School offers sailing lessons to all age groups during the summer, and there are frequent regattas for different boat classes. The marina in Dartford Bay offers access to town by boat and leads into Deacon Mills Park.

Off of the water, there is an extensive network of bike trails and routes available, including "Loop the Lake," a 24 mile trail which circumnavigates the perimeter of the lake. The Green Lake Conservancy and Green Lake Sanitary district maintain properties that offer public hiking trails at various locations. Green Lake has several golf courses around it, including Tuscumbia Country Club, the oldest course in the state.

The entire lake gradually freezes over during the winter. On the ice, there is ice skating, hockey, ice fishing, snowmobiling, and iceboating. There are frequent iceboat races hosted by the Green Lake Yacht Club.

Off of the ice, there are opportunities for cross-country skiing, snowshoeing, and snowmobiling.

In popular culture
 A season 4 episode of the Discovery Channel series A Haunting, called Legend Trippers, takes place in Green Lake and the nearby town of Montello.

References

External links
 Big Green Lake page from the Wisconsin Department of Natural Resources
 Green Lake Conservancy
 Green Lake Association

Lakes of Green Lake County, Wisconsin